Mkapa Bridge is the longest bridge in Tanzania across the Rufiji River. It was financed through a US$30 million loan from the Kuwait Fund, OPEC and the Government of Saudi Arabia.

At inauguration in 2003, it was amongst the longest road bridges in east and southern Africa. The construction of the bridge has helped immensely in connecting the southern regions to other important areas of the country. It is named after Benjamin Mkapa, the third President of Tanzania.

References

Bridges in Tanzania
Rufiji River